Squads for the Football at the 1974 Asian Games played in Tehran, Iran.

Group A

Head coach: Choi Yung-keun



Head coach: Seraniw Chinwala

Group B



Head coach: P. K. Banerjee

Head coach: Thamir Muhsin



Group C

Head coach:  David Schweitzer

Head coach: Ken Naganuma

Head coach: Jalil Che Din

Head coach: Florentino Broce

Group D



Head coach: Sein Hlaing

Head coach:  Frank O'Farrell



References

External links
Japan International Matches - Details 1970-1979

1974
Squads